Dymon Asia is an Asia-focused investment management firm based in Singapore. It is considered one of the largest hedge funds in Singapore and Asia.

History
Dymon Asia was founded in 2008 by Danny Yong and Keith Tan. Yong was previously a Managing Director at Citadel LLC and Head of Trading for South East Asian FX and Derivatives at Goldman Sachs.

In August 2008, Paul Tudor Jones provided US$100 million of seed funding to Dymon Asia.

In May 2014, Temasek Holdings invested US$500 million in Dymon Asia and also took a minority stake in the company.

Business overview
Dymon Asia is an investment firm that invests in both the public equity as well as the private equity markets. It is headquartered in Singapore with additional offices in Hong Kong, Tokyo and London.

Its flagship fund is the Dymon Asia Macro Fund which held US$2 billion assets under management and had a return of 37% in the first quarter of 2020.

In 2020, the US$1 billion Dymon Asia Multi-Strategy Investment Fund was launched.

Aside from the two funds above, Dymon Asia also runs a China Absolute Return Bond Fund and the Jadea Segregated Portfolio, a Greater China-focused long-short equity fund.

Dymon Asia Private Equity
In 2012, Dymon Asia Private Equity was founded as the Private Equity arm of Dymon Asia. It is focused on making investments in SME companies in Southeast Asia.

Private Equity Funds

Dymon Asia Ventures 
In 2015, Dymon Asia Ventures was launched as the venture capital arm of Dymon Asia and raised US$50 million in 2017 to invest in fintech companies. In 2020, Dymon Asia Ventures was spun-off as a separate company to form Integra Partners.

Notable investments include Capital Match and QxBranch.

References

External links
 Official website
 Private Equity website

Investment management companies of Singapore
Hedge funds
Financial services companies established in 2008
2008 establishments in Singapore
Private equity firms of Singapore